Ditrans,polycis-polyprenyl diphosphate synthase ((2E,6E)-farnesyl diphosphate specific) (RER2, Rer2p, Rer2p Z-prenyltransferase, Srt1p, Srt2p Z-prenyltransferase, ACPT, dehydrodolichyl diphosphate synthase 1) is an enzyme with systematic name (2E,6E)-farnesyl-diphosphate:isopentenyl-diphosphate cistransferase (adding 10--55 isopentenyl units). This enzyme catalyses the following chemical reaction

 (2E,6E)-farnesyl diphosphate + n isopentenyl diphosphate  n diphosphate + ditrans, polycis-polyprenyl diphosphate (n  10--55)

The enzyme is involved in biosynthesis of dolichol (a long-chain polyprenol) with a saturated alpha-isoprene unit.

References

External links 
 

EC 2.5.1